The LG G Pro Lite is a smartphone designed and manufactured by LG Electronics.  It was announced on October 10, 2013, and became available in November 2013.

Hardware

Processor
The LG G Pro Lite features a MediaTek MT6577 SoC with a Dual-core ARM Cortex-A9 processor clocked at 1.0 GHz. It also featured a PowerVR SGX531 graphics processor running at 200 MHz.

Memory
The LG G Pro Lite has 1 GB of RAM and 4 GB of internal storage which may be expanded via a microSD card up to 32 GB.

Screen
The phone features a 5.5" IPS LCD of 540x960 resolution and displaying 16M colors at ~200 PPI pixel density.

Cameras
The LG G Pro Lite has an 8 MP back-illuminated camera sensor and a single LED flash. The phone is also capable of recording FullHD 1080p video at 30 FPS. The phone also features a front-facing 1.3 MP camera, capable of recording HD 720p video at 30 FPS. The camera supports digital zoom of up to 8X magnification.

Battery
The LG G Pro Lite is powered by a standard Lithium-Polymer battery of 3140 mAh

Software features and services
The LG G Pro Lite runs on Google's Android 4.4.2 KitKat operating system skinned with LG Optimus UI 3.0.

Critical reception
LG G Pro Lite has received a generally favorable reception. CNET reviewed it as a so-so device that is meant for the low end market. PhoneArena reviewed it as an overall great device except for the screen resolution, which seems to be mediocre compared to its competition.

See also
List of Android devices
Smartphone
LG G series

Notes and references

Android (operating system) devices
G Pro Lite
Mobile phones introduced in 2013
Discontinued smartphones
Mobile phones with infrared transmitter